Rini Coolen (born 10 February 1967) is a Dutch retired football defender and currently the Head of the Feyenoord Academy.

Club career
Coolen played professionally for Go Ahead Eagles, Heracles, De Graafschap and AZ.

Managerial career
He retired in 1995 and became a football manager who worked for Heracles Almelo, FC Twente and AGOVV Apeldoorn. He left FC Twente by mutual agreement on 1 February 2006. In November 2008 he signed for RBC Roosendaal as the successor of released coach Rob Meppelink. In 2010, he was appointed manager of A-League club Adelaide United.

His inaugural season with Adelaide United proved to be a success, taking the club from their disastrous last place finish in the 2009-10 season to third place in the 2010-11 season. His time at the club was marred with off-field dramas, most notably surrounding former Reds captain Travis Dodd who moved to Perth Glory. Coolen proposed a plan to the club and started rebuilding the team after being signed to a four-year contract.

Coolen released several players including Travis Dodd, Paul Reid, Adam Hughes and Lucas Pantelis. Imports brought in by Coolen such as Evgeniy Levchenko, Ricardo Da Silva and Andwele Slory failed to make an impact. After a poor start to the 2011/2012 season, it was announced on 18 December 2011, that Coolen would be replaced by former Adelaide United coach John Kosmina. He was supposed to stay at the club as the youth team coach, however on 21 December 2011, it was announced that he had left the club. Coolen took the club to court for breaching his four-year contract and was awarded $400,000 in an out-of-court settlement.

In 2015 he was coach of the Aruba national football team for 6 weeks.

In August 2016, Coolen left his post as Academy boss at PEC Zwolle to join Fred Rutten as his assistant at Al Shabab in Dubai.

On 19 July 2018, Coolen was appointed interim manager of Rosenborg.

On 11 June 2020, Feyenoord announced that Coolen had signed a 2-year contract with the club to become the coach of the club's new Under-21 team from the 2020–2021 season. On 21 May 2021, Feyenoord announced that Coolen would become the new head of the club's youth academy.

Honours
Rosenborg
Eliteserien: 2018
Norwegian Cup: 2018

References

Statistics

External links
  Profile 

1967 births
Living people
Footballers from Arnhem
Dutch footballers
Association football defenders
Heracles Almelo players
Go Ahead Eagles players
AZ Alkmaar players
De Graafschap players
Eredivisie players
Eerste Divisie players
Dutch football managers
Dutch expatriate football managers
FC Twente managers
AGOVV Apeldoorn managers
RBC Roosendaal managers
Adelaide United FC managers
Aruba national football team managers
Expatriate soccer managers in Australia
Dutch expatriate sportspeople in Australia
Dutch expatriate sportspeople in the United Arab Emirates
A-League Men managers
Expatriate football managers in Norway
Dutch expatriate sportspeople in Norway
Rosenborg BK managers
Eliteserien managers
FC Twente non-playing staff